Daniël Deen (born 13 February 2003) is a Dutch professional footballer who plays as a goalkeeper for AZ Alkmaar.

Career
Daniël Deen joined the AZ academy at the under-12 level, having previously been with VSV in Velsen. He agreed to his first professional contract with the club in July 2021, signing a two-year contract.

In December 2022 Deen was included in a squad of 30 players travelling with the AZ first team on a mid-season training camp in Valencia, Spain. He made his professional debut for Jong AZ in January 2023 in the Eerste Divisie keeping a clean sheet in a 2–0 win over Jong Utrecht. That same month he also appeared in his first match day squad Saturday for AZ Alkmaar, being named amongst the match day substitutes in the Eredivisie.

References

External links
 

Living people
2003 births
Dutch footballers
Association football goalkeepers
Jong AZ players
Eerste Divisie players